Maggie, Margie or Margaret Nichols may refer to:

Margaret Nichols (actress) (1891–1941), American 1910s silent film performer a/k/a Marguerite Nichols
Margaret Nichols, American romance novelist (List of Harlequin Romance novels released in 1949)
Margaret Nichols (animator) (c.1930–2012), American studio animator and animation director a/k/a Margaret Gruwell
Maggie Nichols (performer) (born 1948), Scottish free-jazz improvising vocalist and dancer a/k/a Maggie Nicols
Margaret Nichols, American psychotherapist and sex researcher since 1980s (Blanchard's transsexualism typology)
Margaret Nichols, American violinist in The Sapphire Trio (Clarinet-violin-piano trio#Current clarinet-violin-piano trio ensembles (2018)) a/k/a Margaret Nichols Baldridge
Margie Nichols, American TV reporter in 1987 (List of George Polk Award winners)
Maggie Nichols (gymnast) (born 1997), American artistic gymnast

See also
John T. and Margaret Nichols House, American structure on National Register since 2005